In mathematics, in number theory, Gauss composition law is a rule, invented by Carl Friedrich Gauss, for performing a binary operation on integral binary quadratic forms (IBQFs). Gauss presented this rule in his Disquisitiones Arithmeticae, a textbook on number theory published in 1801,  in Articles 234 - 244. Gauss composition law is one of the deepest results in the theory of IBQFs and Gauss's formulation of the law and the proofs its properties as given by Gauss are generally considered highly complicated and very difficult. Several later mathematicians have simplified the formulation of the composition law and have presented it in a format suitable for numerical computations. The concept has also found generalisations in several directions.

Integral binary quadratic forms

An expression of the form , where  are all integers, is called an integral binary quadratic form (IBQF). The form  is called a primitive IBQF if  are relatively prime. The quantity  is called the discriminant of the IBQF . An integer  is the discriminant of some IBQF if and only if .   is called a fundamental discriminant if and only if one of the following statements holds

   and is square-free,

If  and  then  is said to be positive definite; if  and  then  is said to be negative definite; if  then  is said to be indefinite.

Equivalence of IBQFs

  and  

The notation  is used to denote the fact that the two forms are equivalent. The relation "" is an equivalence relation in the set of all IBQFs.
 

  and  

The relation in the set of IBQFs of being improperly equivalent is also an equivalence relation. 

It can be easily seen that equivalent IBQFs (properly or improperly) have the same discriminant.

Gauss's formulation of the composition law

Historical context

The following identity, called Brahmagupta identity, was known to the Indian mathematician Brahmagupta (598–668) who used it to calculate successively better fractional approximations to square roots of positive integers:

 

Writing  this identity can be put in the form 

 where .

The composition law of IBQFs

Consider the following IBQFs:

If it is possible to find integers  and  such that the following six numbers 

have no common divisors other than ±1, and such that if we let

the following relation is identically satisfied

, 

It may be noted that the composite of two IBQFs, if it exists, is not unique.

Example

Consider the following binary quadratic forms:

Let

We have
.
These six numbers have no common divisors other than ±1.
Let

,
.

Then it can be verified that 

 .

An algorithm to find the composite of two IBQFs

The following algorithm can be used to compute the composite of two IBQFs.

Algorithm 

Given the following IBQFs having the same discriminant :

 Compute 
 Compute 
 Compute  such that 
 Compute 
 Compute 
 Compute 
 Compute 
 Compute 

Properties of the composition law

Existence of the composite

The composite of two IBQFs exists if and only if they have the same discriminant.

Equivalent forms and the composition law

Let  be IBQFs and let there be the following equivalences:
 
 

A binary operation

Let  be a fixed integer and consider set  of all possible IBQFs of discriminant . Let  be the set of equivalence classes in this set under the equivalence relation "". Then the following equation

The group GD

The set  is a finite abelian group under the binary operation . 

The identity element in the group  = 

Modern approach to the composition law

The following sketch of the modern approach to the composition law of IBQFs is based on a monograph by Duncan A. Buell. The book may be consulted for further details and for proofs of all the statements made hereunder.

Quadratic algebraic numbers and integers

Let  be the set of integers. Hereafter, in this section, elements of  will be referred as rational integers to distinguish them from algebraic integers to be defined below. 

A complex number  is called a quadratic algebraic number if it satisfies an equation of the form

 where .

 is called a quadratic algebraic integer if it satisfies an equation of the form 

 where 

The quadratic algebraic numbers are numbers of the form

The integer  is called the radicand of the algebraic integer . The norm of the quadratic algebraic number  is defined as 

.

Let  be the field of rational numbers. This field can be shown to be 

The discriminant  of the field  is defined by

Let   be a rational integer without square factors (except 1). This set is given by

 is a ring under ordinary addition and multiplication. If we let 

then 

.

Ideals in quadratic fields

Let  be an ideal in the ring of integers ; that is, let  be a nonempty subset of  such that for any  and any , . (An ideal  as defined here is sometimes referred to as an integral ideal to distinguish from fractional ideal to be defined below.) This is indicated by writing .

. 

The norm is independent of the choice of the basis.

Some special ideals

A fractional ideal is a subset  of the quadratic field   for which the following two properties hold:

 For any  and for any , .
 There exists a fixed algebraic integer  such that for every , .

An ideal  is called a principal ideal if there exists an algebraic integer  such that .

There is this important result: "Given any ideal (integral or fractional) , there exists an integral ideal  such that the product ideal  is a principal ideal."

An equivalence relation in the set of ideals

Two (integral or fractional) ideals   and  ares said to be equivalent, dented , if there is a principal ideal  such that . The relation, in the set of ideals, of being equivalent or narrowly equivalent as defined here is indeed an equivalence relation. 

The equivalence classes (respectively, narrow equivalence classes) of fractional ideals of a ring of quadratic algebraic integers   form an abelian group under multiplication of ideals. The identity of the group is the class of all principal ideals (respectively, the class of all principal ideals  with ).

Binary quadratic forms and classes of ideals

The main result that connects the IBQFs and classes of ideals can now be stated as follows: 

"The group of classes of binary quadratic forms of discriminant  is isomorphic to the narrow class group of the quadratic number field ."

Bhargava's approach to the composition law

Manjul Bhargava, a Canadian-American Fields Medal winning mathematician introduced a configuration, called a Bhargava cube, of eight integers  (see figure) to study the composition laws of binary quadratic forms and other such forms. Defining matrices associated with the opposite faces of this cube as given below

,

Bhargava constructed three IBQFs as follows:

Bhargava established the following result connecting a Bhargava cube with the Gauss composition law:

"If a cube A gives rise to three primitive binary quadratic forms Q1, Q2, Q3,  then Q1, Q2, Q3 have the same discriminant, and the product of these three forms is the identity in the group defined by Gauss composition. Conversely, if Q1, Q2, Q3 are any three primitive binary quadratic forms of the same discriminant whose product is the identity under Gauss composition, then there exists a cube A yielding Q1, Q2, Q3."

References

Carl Friedrich Gauss
Quadratic forms
Number theory